Coleman Crawford is a former college basketball head coach.  He coached the Akron Zips men's basketball team from 1989 to 1995.  In six seasons, he guided the Zips to a 71–91 record.

References

Year of birth missing (living people)
Living people
Akron Zips men's basketball coaches
Florida State Seminoles men's basketball coaches
Fort Worth Flyers coaches
Junior college men's basketball players in the United States
Middle Tennessee Blue Raiders men's basketball coaches
North Alabama Lions men's basketball players
SMU Mustangs men's basketball coaches
Tennessee Volunteers basketball coaches
Tulsa Golden Hurricane men's basketball coaches